The Park House Hotel, also known as St. Agatha's Seminary and Burkeley Apartments, is an historic building located in Iowa City, Iowa, United States. The building was built in 1852 for Ferdinand Haberstroh.  It catered to those who did business when the city was the capitol of Iowa, and it is one of the few remaining commercial buildings from that era.  After Haberstroh died in 1860, the Rev. William Emonds of near-by St. Mary's Catholic Church bought the property and its debt.  Two years later the Sisters of Charity of the Blessed Virgin Mary from Dubuque, Iowa opened St. Agatha's Female Seminary.  The building acquired its mansard roof in 1875.  Classrooms were located on the first two floors and residential space for the sisters and students who boarded here were on the upper two floors. The school closed in 1909 and Albert Burkeley converted the building into a women's boarding house called "Svendi".  After 1918 it became an apartment building known as "Burkeley Place", and it has been an apartment building ever since.

The building was individually listed on the National Register of Historic Places in 1978.  In 2004 it was included as a contributing property in the Jefferson Street Historic District.

References

Residential buildings completed in 1852
Apartment buildings in Iowa City, Iowa
Hotel buildings on the National Register of Historic Places in Iowa
Apartment buildings on the National Register of Historic Places in Iowa
National Register of Historic Places in Iowa City, Iowa
Individually listed contributing properties to historic districts on the National Register in Iowa